Acrocercops irradians is a moth of the family Gracillariidae, known from Maharashtra, India, as well as Taiwan. It was described by Edward Meyrick in 1931. The hostplant for the species is Zingiber officinale.

References

irradians
Moths of Asia
Moths of Taiwan
Moths described in 1931